Ranstadt is a municipality in the Wetteraukreis, in Hesse, Germany. It is located approximately 35 kilometers northeast of Frankfurt am Main.

References

External links
 

Wetteraukreis